Monument is the second studio album by American metalcore band Miss May I, released on August 17, 2010. This album debuted at No. 76 on the Billboard 200 chart.

Release
On June 24, Miss May I announced via Facebook that the new album "Monument" will be released August 17 and that they are recording a video at Mansfield Prison for the song "Relentless Chaos." On July 14th, guitarist Justin Aufdenkampe posted a picture on his Twitter account of the album's track list and song lengths. On August 5th, it was announced that the song "Rust" would only be available through preorder on iTunes via the band's Facebook. On September 3rd, the video for "Relentless Chaos" was released via YouTube.

On May 21, 2011, it was announced that Monument would be released in a Deluxe Edition on June 21, 2011, featuring three new songs, the "Rust" b-side, and a DVD featuring music videos, interviews, live songs, and more.

Critical reception

Metal Hammer reviewed the album in the February 2011 issue. It received a low score of 5/10 and was criticised for sounding unoriginal and too much like the band As I Lay Dying. Writer Adam Rees wrote "Miss May I struggle to deliver anything new...their best moments sound suspiciously like recent As I Lay Dying output on an off day...."

In contrast "Monument" was well received by Rock Sound who awarded it 8/10 "Since metalcore started merchandising a band’s image and paint-splattered jock-straps, before a fairly blueprinted sound structure, it’s been a difficult path to tread to find which bands are worth sticking around to listen to, but with their second outing ‘Monument’, Miss May I have firmly marked their place for Killswitch Engage’s support slots. The thunderous attacks of ‘Relentless Chaos’ and ‘Creations’ show the band’s steps towards thrash tendencies to a well worked effect. With exhilarating time signatures and ruthless musicianship, Miss May I have shown what it was that made metalcore exciting in the first place, and why we can love it once again."

Track listing

Personnel

Miss May I
 Levi Benton – unclean vocals, programming
 B.J. Stead – lead guitar
 Ryan Neff – bass, clean vocals, lead vocals track 9
 Justin Aufdemkampe – rhythm guitar
 Jerod Boyd – drums, percussion

Guest musicians
Brandan Schieppati – vocals on "Rust"

Production
Production, engineering, mixing and mastering by Joey Sturgis
Management by Chris Rubey & Eric Rushing (The Artery Foundation)
Booking by Dave Shapiro (The Agency Group)
Artwork by Yang Xueguo
Layout by Sons of Nero

Deluxe Edition Production
Production, engineering on tracks "My Hardship", "Descending Discovery" and "Forbidden" by Landon Tewers & Miss May I & Joey Sturgis (tracks: 4–14)
Mixing & mastering by Joey Sturgis
Artwork by God Machine

References

Miss May I albums
2010 albums
Albums produced by Joey Sturgis
Albums with cover art by Sons of Nero
Rise Records albums